The Thailand Swimming Association (TASA) is the national governing body for Aquatic sports include, Diving, Marathon swimming, Masters swimming, Swimming, Synchronized swimming, Water polo. It is accredited by the International Swimming Federation (Fédération Internationale de Natation or FINA) which is the governing body for the sport of Swimming in the world, and the National Olympic Committee of Thailand (NOCT). It founded on 24 June 1959.

The association is headquartered in Bang Kapi, Bangkok. The current head of the federation is Gen. Prawit Wongsuwan.

Championships
Thailand Swimming Association organises championships every year in each of the sporting disciplines.

Swimming
Long course

Short course

Master swimming

Open water swimming

Diving

Sponsors
The following are the sponsors of Thailand Swimming Association:
 Grand Sport
 PTT Global Chemical
 PTT Group
 GPP
 ThaiOil
 True Corporation
 King Power
 Thai Beverage
 CPF
 Bangchak

See also
List of Thai records in swimming

External links
Thailand Swimming Association 

Thailand
Thailand
Swimming in Thailand
Aquatics